This is a list of the bird species recorded in Chile. Unless otherwise noted, the list is that of the South American Classification Committee (SACC) of the American Ornithological Society. The SACC list includes species recorded in mainland Chile, on the Chilean islands of the Cape Horn area, on other islands and waters near the mainland, and on and around the Juan Fernández Islands. The list's taxonomic treatment (designation and sequence of orders, families, and species) and nomenclature (common and scientific names) are also those of the SACC.

According to the SACC, the avifauna of Chile has 519 confirmed species, of which 12 are endemic, 122 are rare or vagrants, six have been introduced by humans, and one is extinct . An additional eight species are hypothetical (see below). One additional vagrant species is added from another source. Thirty-five of the species on the Chilean SACC list are globally threatened.

The following tags have been used to highlight several categories.

 (V) Vagrant - a species that rarely or accidentally occurs in Chile
 (E) Endemic - a species endemic to Chile
 (I) Introduced - a species introduced to Chile as a consequence, direct or indirect, of human actions
 (H) Hypothetical - a species recorded but with "no tangible evidence" according to the SACC

Rheas

Order: RheiformesFamily: Rheidae

The rheas are large flightless birds native to South America. Their feet have three toes rather than four which allows them to run faster. One species has been recorded in Chile.

Lesser rhea, Rhea pennata

Tinamous
Order: TinamiformesFamily: Tinamidae

The tinamous are one of the most ancient groups of birds. Although they look similar to other ground-dwelling birds like quail and grouse, they have no close relatives and are classified as a single family, Tinamidae, within their own order, the Tinamiformes. They are distantly related to the ratites (order Struthioniformes), that includes the rheas, emus, and kiwis. Six species have been recorded in Chile.

Ornate tinamou, Nothoprocta ornata
Chilean tinamou, Nothoprocta perdicaria (E)
Andean tinamou, Nothoprocta pentlandii
Elegant crested-tinamou, Eudromia elegans
Puna tinamou, Tinamotis pentlandii
Patagonian tinamou, Tinamotis ingoufi

Ducks

Order: AnseriformesFamily: Anatidae

Anatidae includes the ducks and most duck-like waterfowl, such as geese and swans. These birds are adapted to an aquatic existence with webbed feet, flattened bills, and feathers that are excellent at shedding water due to an oily coating. Twenty-nine species have been recorded in Chile.

Fulvous whistling-duck, Dendrocygna bicolor (V)
White-faced whistling-duck, Dendrocygna viduata (V)
Black-bellied whistling-duck, Dendrocygna autumnalis (V)
Black-necked swan, Cygnus melancoryphus
Coscoroba swan, Coscoroba coscoroba
Andean goose, Oressochen melanoptera
Upland goose, Chloephaga picta
Kelp goose, Chloephaga hybrida
Ashy-headed goose, Chloephaga poliocephala
Ruddy-headed goose, Chloephaga rubidiceps
Comb duck, Sarkidiornis sylvicola (V)
Torrent duck, Merganetta armata
Flying steamer-duck, Tachyeres patachonicus
Flightless steamer-duck, Tachyeres pteneres
Crested duck, Lophonetta specularioides
Spectacled duck, Speculanas specularis
Puna teal, Spatula puna
Silver teal, Spatula versicolor
Red shoveler, Spatula platalea
Blue-winged teal, Spatula discors (V)
Cinnamon teal, Spatula cyanoptera
Chiloe wigeon, Mareca sibilatrix
White-cheeked pintail, Anas bahamensis
Yellow-billed pintail, Anas georgica
Yellow-billed teal, Anas flavirostris
Rosy-billed pochard, Netta peposaca
Black-headed duck, Heteronetta atricapilla
Ruddy duck, Oxyura jamaicensis (the local subspecies is also called Andean duck)
Lake duck, Oxyura vittata

New World quails

Order: GalliformesFamily: Odontophoridae

The New World quails are small, plump terrestrial birds only distantly related to the quails of the Old World, but named for their similar appearance and habits. One species has been recorded in Chile.

California quail, Callipepla californica (I)

Pheasants
Order: GalliformesFamily: Phasianidae

The Phasianidae are a family of terrestrial birds which consists of quails, partridges, snowcocks, francolins, spurfowls, tragopans, monals, pheasants, peafowls and jungle fowls. In general, they are plump (although they vary in size) and have broad, relatively short wings. One species has been recorded in Chile.

Ring-necked pheasant, Phasianus colchicus (I)

Flamingos

Order: PhoenicopteriformesFamily: Phoenicopteridae

Flamingos filter-feed on shellfish and algae. Their oddly-shaped beaks are specially adapted to separate mud and silt from the food they consume and, uniquely, are used upside-down. Three species have been recorded in Chile.

Chilean flamingo, Phoenicopterus chilensis
Andean flamingo, Phoenicoparrus andinus
James's flamingo (Puna flamingo), Phoenicoparrus jamesi

Grebes

Order: PodicipediformesFamily: Podicipedidae

Grebes are small to medium-large freshwater diving birds. They have lobed toes and are excellent swimmers and divers. However, they have their feet placed far back on the body, making them quite ungainly on land. Five species have been recorded in Chile.

White-tufted grebe, Rollandia rolland
Pied-billed grebe, Podilymbus podiceps
Great grebe, Podiceps major
Silvery grebe, Podiceps occipitalis
Hooded grebe, Podiceps gallardoi (V)

Pigeons

Order: ColumbiformesFamily: Columbidae

Pigeons and doves are stout-bodied birds with short necks and short slender bills with a fleshy cere. Twelve species have been recorded in Chile.

Rock pigeon, Columba livia (I)
Picazuro pigeon, Patagioenas picazuro (V)
Spot-winged pigeon, Patagioenas maculosa
Chilean pigeon, Patagioenas araucana
West Peruvian dove, Zenaida meloda
Eared dove, Zenaida auriculata
Bare-faced ground dove, Metriopelia ceciliae
Black-winged ground dove, Metriopelia melanoptera
Golden-spotted ground dove, Metriopelia aymara
Ruddy ground dove, Columbina talpacoti (V)
Picui ground dove, Columbina picui
Croaking ground dove, Columbina cruziana

Cuckoos

Order: CuculiformesFamily: Cuculidae

The family Cuculidae includes cuckoos, roadrunners and anis. These birds are of variable size with slender bodies, long tails, and strong legs. Four species have been recorded in Chile.

Smooth-billed ani, Crotophaga ani (V)
Groove-billed ani, Crotophaga sulcirostris
Dark-billed cuckoo, Coccyzus melacoryphus (V)
Yellow-billed cuckoo, Coccyzus americanus (V)

Oilbird
Order: SteatornithiformesFamily: Steatornithidae

The oilbird is a slim, long-winged bird related to the nightjars. It is nocturnal and a specialist feeder on the fruit of the oil palm.

Oilbird, Steatornis caripensis (V)

Potoos
Order: NyctibiiformesFamily: Nyctibiidae

The potoos (sometimes called poor-me-ones) are large near passerine birds related to the nightjars and frogmouths. They are nocturnal insectivores that lack the bristles around the mouth found in the true nightjars. One species has been recorded in Chile.

Common potoo, Nyctibius griseus (V)

Nightjars
Order: CaprimulgiformesFamily: Caprimulgidae

Nightjars are medium-sized nocturnal birds that usually nest on the ground. They have long wings, short legs and very short bills. Most have small feet, of little use for walking, and long pointed wings. Their soft plumage is camouflaged to resemble bark or leaves. Five species have been recorded in Chile.

Nacunda nighthawk, Chordeiles nacunda (V)
Lesser nighthawk, Chordeiles acutipennis (V)
Common nighthawk, Chordeiles minor (V)
Band-winged nightjar, Systellura longirostris
Tschudi's nightjar, Systellura decussata

Swifts
Order: ApodiformesFamily: Apodidae

Swifts are small birds which spend the majority of their lives flying. These birds have very short legs and never settle voluntarily on the ground, perching instead only on vertical surfaces. Many swifts have long swept-back wings which resemble a crescent or boomerang. Three species have been recorded in Chile.

White-collared swift, Streptoprocne zonaris
Chimney swift, Chaetura pelagica
Andean swift, Aeronautes andecolus

Hummingbirds

Order: ApodiformesFamily: Trochilidae

Hummingbirds are small birds capable of hovering in mid-air due to the rapid flapping of their wings. They are the only birds that can fly backward. Ten species have been recorded in Chile.

Sparkling violetear, Colibri coruscans
Green-backed firecrown, Sephanoides sephaniodes
Juan Fernandez firecrown, Sephanoides fernandensis (E)
Andean hillstar, Oreotrochilus estella
White-sided hillstar, Oreotrochilus leucopleurus
Giant hummingbird, Patagona gigas
Chilean woodstar, Eulidia yarrellii (E)
Oasis hummingbird, Rhodopis vesper
Peruvian sheartail, Thaumastura cora
Glittering-bellied emerald, Chlorostilbon lucidus (V)

Limpkin
Order: GruiformesFamily: Aramidae

The limpkin is an odd bird that looks like a large rail, but is skeletally closer to the cranes. It is found in marshes with some trees or scrub as far north as southern Florida.

Limpkin, Aramus guarauna (V)

Rails

Order: GruiformesFamily: Rallidae

Rallidae is a large family of small to medium-sized birds which includes the rails, crakes, coots and gallinules. Typically they inhabit dense vegetation in damp environments near lakes, swamps, or rivers. In general, they are shy and secretive birds, making them difficult to observe. Most species have strong legs and long toes which are well adapted to soft uneven surfaces. They tend to have short, rounded wings and to be weak fliers. Fourteen species have been recorded in Chile.

Austral rail, Rallus antarcticus
Purple gallinule, Porphyrio martinica (V) 
Black rail, Laterallus jamaicensis
Spotted rail, Pardirallus maculatus (V)
Plumbeous rail, Pardirallus sanguinolentus
Spot-flanked gallinule, Porphyriops melanops
Dot-winged crake, Porzana spiloptera
Common gallinule, Gallinula galeata
Red-fronted coot, Fulica rufifrons
Horned coot, Fulica cornuta
Giant coot, Fulica gigantea
Red-gartered coot, Fulica armillata
Slate-colored coot, Fulica ardesiaca
White-winged coot, Fulica leucoptera

Plovers

Order: CharadriiformesFamily: Charadriidae

The family Charadriidae includes the plovers, dotterels and lapwings. They are small to medium-sized birds with compact bodies, short, thick necks and long, usually pointed, wings. They are found in open country worldwide, mostly in habitats near water. Fourteen species have been recorded in Chile.

American golden-plover, Pluvialis dominica
Black-bellied plover, Pluvialis squatarola
Tawny-throated dotterel, Oreopholus ruficollis
Southern lapwing, Vanellus chilensis
Andean lapwing, Vanellus resplendens
Rufous-chested dotterel, Charadrius modestus
Killdeer, Charadrius vociferus
Semipalmated plover, Charadrius semipalmatus
Wilson's plover, Charadrius wilsonia (V)
Collared plover, Charadrius collaris
Puna plover, Charadrius alticola
Two-banded plover, Charadrius falklandicus
Snowy plover, Charadrius nivosus
Diademed sandpiper-plover, Phegornis mitchellii

Oystercatchers

Order: CharadriiformesFamily: Haematopodidae

The oystercatchers are large and noisy plover-like birds, with strong bills used for smashing or prising open molluscs. Three species have been recorded in Chile.

American oystercatcher, Haematopus palliatus
Blackish oystercatcher, Haematopus ater
Magellanic oystercatcher, Haematopus leucopodus

Avocets and stilts
Order: CharadriiformesFamily: Recurvirostridae

Recurvirostridae is a family of large wading birds, which includes the avocets and stilts. The avocets have long legs and long up-curved bills. The stilts have extremely long legs and long, thin, straight bills. Two species have been recorded in Chile.

Black-necked stilt, Himantopus mexicanus
Andean avocet, Recurvirostra andina

Thick-knees
Order: CharadriiformesFamily: Burhinidae

The thick-knees are a group of largely tropical waders in the family Burhinidae. They are found worldwide within the tropical zone, with some species also breeding in temperate Europe and Australia. They are medium to large waders with strong black or yellow-black bills, large yellow eyes and cryptic plumage. Despite being classed as waders, most species have a preference for arid or semi-arid habitats. One species has been recorded in Chile.

Peruvian thick-knee, Burhinus superciliaris

Sheathbills

Order: CharadriiformesFamily: Chionidae

The sheathbills are scavengers of the Antarctic regions. They have white plumage and look plump and dove-like but are believed to be similar to the ancestors of the modern gulls and terns. One species has been recorded in Chile.

Snowy sheathbill, Chionis alba

Magellanic plover

Order: CharadriiformesFamily: Pluvianellidae

The Magellanic plover is a rare wader found only in southernmost South America. In its build and habits it is similar to a turnstone. Its upperparts and breast are pale gray and the rest of the underparts are white. It has short red legs, a black bill and a red eye. In young birds, the eyes and legs are yellowish.

Magellanic plover, Pluvianellus socialis

Sandpipers

Order: CharadriiformesFamily: Scolopacidae

Scolopacidae is a large diverse family of small to medium-sized shorebirds including the sandpipers, curlews, godwits, shanks, tattlers, woodcocks, snipes, dowitchers, and phalaropes. The majority of these species eat small invertebrates picked out of the mud or soil. Variation in length of legs and bills enables multiple species to feed in the same habitat, particularly on the coast, without direct competition for food. Thirty-two species have been recorded in Chile.

Upland sandpiper, Bartramia longicauda
Eskimo curlew, Numenius borealis (extinct)
Whimbrel, Numenius phaeopus
Bar-tailed godwit, Limosa lapponica (V)
Hudsonian godwit, Limosa haemastica
Marbled godwit, Limosa fedoa (V)
Ruddy turnstone, Arenaria interpres
Red knot, Calidris canutus
Surfbird, Calidris virgata
Stilt sandpiper, Calidris himantopus
Curlew sandpiper, Calidris ferruginea (V)
Sanderling, Calidris alba
Baird's sandpiper, Calidris bairdii
Least sandpiper, Calidris minutilla
White-rumped sandpiper, Calidris fuscicollis
Buff-breasted sandpiper, Calidris subruficollis (V)
Pectoral sandpiper, Calidris melanotos
Semipalmated sandpiper, Calidris pusilla
Western sandpiper, Calidris mauri
Short-billed dowitcher, Limnodromus griseus (V)
Fuegian snipe, Gallinago stricklandii
Magellanic snipe, Gallinago magellanica
Puna snipe, Gallinago andina
Wilson's phalarope, Phalaropus tricolor
Red-necked phalarope, Phalaropus lobatus (V)
Red phalarope, Phalaropus fulicarius
Spotted sandpiper, Actitis macularius
Solitary sandpiper, Tringa solitaria (V)
Wandering tattler, Tringa incana (V)
Greater yellowlegs, Tringa melanoleuca
Willet, Tringa semipalmata
Lesser yellowlegs, Tringa flavipes

Seedsnipes
Order: CharadriiformesFamily: Thinocoridae

The seedsnipes are a small family of birds that superficially resemble sparrows. They have short legs and long wings and are herbivorous waders. Four species have been recorded in Chile.

Rufous-bellied seedsnipe, Attagis gayi
White-bellied seedsnipe, Attagis malouinus
Gray-breasted seedsnipe, Thinocorus orbignyianus
Least seedsnipe, Thinocorus rumicivorus

Jacanas
Order: CharadriiformesFamily: Jacanidae

The jacanas are a family of waders found throughout the tropics. They are identifiable by their huge feet and claws which enable them to walk on floating vegetation in the shallow lakes that are their preferred habitat. One species has been recorded in Chile.

Wattled jacana, Jacana jacana (V)

Painted-snipes
Order: CharadriiformesFamily: Rostratulidae

Painted-snipes are short-legged, long-billed birds similar in shape to the true snipes, but more brightly colored. One species has been recorded in Chile.

South American painted-snipe, Nycticryphes semicollaris

Skuas
Order: CharadriiformesFamily: Stercorariidae

The family Stercorariidae are, in general, medium to large birds, typically with gray or brown plumage, often with white markings on the wings. They nest on the ground in temperate and arctic regions and are long-distance migrants. Six species have been recorded in Chile.

Chilean skua, Stercorarius chilensis
South polar skua, Stercorarius maccormicki
Brown skua, Stercorarius antarctica (V)
Pomarine jaeger, Stercorarius pomarinus
Parasitic jaeger, Stercorarius parasiticus
Long-tailed jaeger, Stercorarius longicaudus

Skimmers
Order: CharadriiformesFamily: Rynchopidae

Skimmers are a small family of tropical tern-like birds. They have an elongated lower mandible which they use to feed by flying low over the water surface and skimming the water for small fish. One species has been recorded in Chile.

Black skimmer, Rynchops niger

Gulls

Order: CharadriiformesFamily: Laridae

Laridae is a family of medium to large seabirds and includes gulls, kittiwakes, and terns. Gulls are typically gray or white, often with black markings on the head or wings. They have longish bills and webbed feet. Terns are a group of generally medium to large seabirds typically with gray or white plumage, often with black markings on the head. Most terns hunt fish by diving but some pick insects off the surface of fresh water. Terns are generally long-lived birds, with several species known to live in excess of 30 years. Thirty-two species of Laridae have been recorded in Chile.

Swallow-tailed gull, Creagrus furcatus
Sabine's gull, Xema sabini
Bonaparte's gull, Chroicocephalus philadelphia (V)
Andean gull, Chroicocephalus serranus
Brown-hooded gull, Chroicocephalus maculipennis
Gray-hooded gull, Chroicocephalus cirrocephalus
Dolphin gull, Leucophaeus scoresbii
Gray gull, Leucophaeus modestus
Laughing gull, Leucophaeus atricilla (V)
Franklin's gull, Leucophaeus pipixcan
Belcher's gull, Larus belcheri
Kelp gull, Larus dominicanus
Herring gull, Larus argentatus (V)
Brown noddy, Anous stolidus
Black noddy, Anous minutus
Gray noddy, Anous albivitta
Sooty tern, Onychoprion fuscatus
Bridled tern, Onychoprion anaethetus (V)
Least tern, Sternula antillarum (V)
Peruvian tern, Sternula lorata
Large-billed tern, Phaetusa simplex (H)
Gull-billed tern, Gelochelidon nilotica (V)
Inca tern, Larosterna inca
Black tern, Chlidonias niger (V)
Common tern, Sterna hirundo
Arctic tern, Sterna paradisaea
South American tern, Sterna hirundinacea
Antarctic tern, Sterna vittata (H)
Snowy-crowned tern, Sterna trudeaui
Elegant tern, Thalasseus elegans
Sandwich tern, Thalasseus sandvicensis
Royal tern, Thalasseus maximus (V)

Tropicbirds

Order: PhaethontiformesFamily: Phaethontidae

Tropicbirds are slender white birds of tropical oceans, with exceptionally long central tail feathers. Their heads and long wings have black markings. Three species have been recorded in Chile.

Red-billed tropicbird, Phaethon aethereus
Red-tailed tropicbird, Phaethon rubricauda
White-tailed tropicbird, Phaethon lepturus

Penguins

Order: SphenisciformesFamily: Spheniscidae

The penguins are a group of aquatic, flightless birds living almost exclusively in the Southern Hemisphere. Most penguins feed on krill, fish, squid and other forms of sealife caught while swimming underwater. Nine species have been recorded in Chile.

King penguin, Aptenodytes patagonicus
Emperor penguin, Aptenodytes forsteri (V)
Gentoo penguin, Pygoscelis papua
Chinstrap penguin, Pygoscelis antarctica (V)
Little penguin, Eudyptula minor (V)
Humboldt penguin, Spheniscus humboldti
Magellanic penguin, Spheniscus magellanicus
Macaroni penguin, Eudyptes chrysolophus
Rockhopper penguin, Eudyptes chrysocome

Albatrosses
Order: ProcellariiformesFamily: Diomedeidae

The albatrosses are among the largest of flying birds, and the great albatrosses from the genus Diomedea have the largest wingspans of any extant birds. Eleven species have been recorded in Chile.

Waved albatross, Phoebastria irrorata (V)
Royal albatross, Diomedea epomophora
Wandering albatross, Diomedea exulans
Sooty albatross, Phoebetria fusca (V)
Light-mantled albatross, Phoebetria palpebrata
Black-browed albatross, Thalassarche melanophris
Gray-headed albatross, Thalassarche chrysostoma
Buller's albatross, Thalassarche bulleri
White-capped albatross (also called shy albatross), Thalassarche cauta (V)
Salvin's albatross, Thalassarche salvini
Chatham albatross, Thalassarche eremita

Southern storm-petrels
Order: ProcellariiformesFamily: Oceanitidae

The storm-petrels are the smallest seabirds, relatives of the petrels, feeding on planktonic crustaceans and small fish picked from the surface, typically while hovering. The flight is fluttering and sometimes bat-like. Until 2018, this family's species were included with the other storm-petrels in family Hydrobatidae. Seven species have been recorded in Chile.

White-bellied storm-petrel, Fregetta grallaria
Black-bellied storm-petrel, Fregetta tropica (V)
Wilson's storm-petrel, Oceanites oceanicus
Pincoya storm-petrel, Oceanites pincoyae
Elliot's storm-petrel, Oceanites gracilis
Gray-backed storm-petrel, Garrodia nereis (V)
White-faced storm-petrel, Pelagodroma marina

Northern storm-petrels
Order: ProcellariiformesFamily: Hydrobatidae

Though the members of this family are similar in many respects to the southern storm-petrels, including their general appearance and habits, there are enough genetic differences to warrant their placement in a separate family. Three species have been recorded in Chile.

Wedge-rumped storm-petrel, Hydrobates tethys
Markham's storm-petrel, Hydrobates markhami
Hornby's storm-petrel, Hydrobates hornbyi

Shearwaters

Order: ProcellariiformesFamily: Procellariidae

The procellariids are the main group of medium-sized "true petrels", characterized by united nostrils with medium septum and a long outer functional primary. Thirty-seven species have been recorded in Chile.

Southern giant-petrel, Macronectes giganteus
Northern giant-petrel, Macronectes halli
Northern fulmar, Fulmarus glacialis (V)
Southern fulmar, Fulmarus glacialoides
Antarctic petrel, Thalassoica antarctica (V)
Cape petrel, Daption capense
Kerguelen petrel, Aphrodroma brevirostris (V)
Gould's petrel, Pterodroma leucoptera  (V)
Great-winged petrel, Pterodroma macroptera (V)
Soft-plumaged petrel, Pterodroma mollis (V)
White-headed petrel, Pterodroma lessonii (H)
Cook's petrel, Pterodroma cookii (V)
Black-winged petrel, Pterodroma nigripennis (V)
Masatierra petrel, Pterodroma defilippiana
Stejneger's petrel, Pterodroma longirostris
Murphy's petrel, Pterodroma ultima (V)
Kermadec petrel, Pterodroma neglecta
Mottled petrel, Pterodroma inexpectata (H)
Juan Fernández petrel, Pterodroma externa
Blue petrel, Halobaena caerulea
Broad-billed prion, Pachyptila vittata (V)
Antarctic prion, Pachyptila desolata
Slender-billed prion, Pachyptila belcheri
Gray petrel, Procellaria cinerea (V)
White-chinned petrel, Procellaria aequinoctialis
Parkinson's petrel, Procellaria parkinsoni
Westland petrel, Procellaria westlandica
Buller's shearwater, Ardenna bulleri
Sooty shearwater, Ardenna griseus
Great shearwater, Ardenna gravis
Pink-footed shearwater, Ardenna creatopus
Flesh-footed shearwater, Ardenna carneipes (V)
Manx shearwater, Puffinus puffinus
Little shearwater, Puffinus elegans
Peruvian diving-petrel, Pelecanoides garnotii
Common diving-petrel, Pelecanoides urinatrix
Magellanic diving-petrel, Pelecanoides magellani

Storks
Order: CiconiiformesFamily: Ciconiidae

Storks are large, long-legged, long-necked, wading birds with long, stout bills. Storks are mute, but bill-clattering is an important mode of communication at the nest. Their nests can be large and may be reused for many years. Many species are migratory. Two species have been recorded in Chile.

Maguari stork, Ciconia maguari (V)
Wood stork, Mycteria americana (V)

Frigatebirds
Order: SuliformesFamily: Fregatidae

Frigatebirds are large seabirds usually found over tropical oceans. They are large, black-and-white or completely black, with long wings and deeply forked tails. The males have colored inflatable throat pouches. They do not swim or walk and cannot take off from a flat surface. Having the largest wingspan-to-body-weight ratio of any bird, they are essentially aerial, able to stay aloft for more than a week. Two species have been recorded in Chile.

Magnificent frigatebird, Fregata magnificens (V)
Great frigatebird, Fregata minor

Boobies
Order: SuliformesFamily: Sulidae

The sulids comprise the gannets and boobies. Both groups are medium to large coastal seabirds that plunge-dive for fish. Six species have been recorded in Chile.

Blue-footed booby, Sula nebouxii
Peruvian booby, Sula variegata
Masked booby, Sula dactylatra
Nazca booby, Sula granti (V)
Red-footed booby, Sula sula (V)
Brown booby, Sula leucogaster (V)

Cormorants

Order: SuliformesFamily: Phalacrocoracidae

Phalacrocoracidae is a family of medium to large coastal, fish-eating seabirds that includes cormorants and shags. Plumage coloration varies, with the majority having mainly dark plumage, some species being black-and-white and a few being colorful. Five species have been recorded in Chile.

Red-legged cormorant, Phalacrocorax gaimardi
Neotropic cormorant, Phalacrocorax brasilianus
Magellanic cormorant, Phalacrocorax magellanicus
Guanay cormorant, Phalacrocorax bougainvillii
Imperial cormorant (shag), Phalacrocorax atriceps

Pelicans

Order: PelecaniformesFamily: Pelecanidae

Pelicans are large water birds with a distinctive pouch under their beak. As with other members of the order Pelecaniformes, they have webbed feet with four toes. Two species have been recorded in Chile.

Brown pelican, Pelecanus occidentalis (V)
Peruvian pelican, Pelecanus thagus

Herons

Order: PelecaniformesFamily: Ardeidae

The family Ardeidae contains the bitterns, herons, and egrets. Herons and egrets are medium to large wading birds with long necks and legs. Bitterns tend to be shorter necked and more wary. Unlike other long-neeecked birds such as storks, ibises, and spoonbills, members of Ardeidae fly with their necks retracted. Twelve species have been recorded in Chile.

Least bittern, Ixobrychus exilis (V)
Stripe-backed bittern, Ixobrychus involucris
Black-crowned night-heron, Nycticorax nycticorax
Yellow-crowned night-heron, Nyctanassa violacea (V)
Striated heron, Butorides striata (V)
Cattle egret, Bubulcus ibis
Cocoi heron, Ardea cocoi
Great egret, Ardea alba
Whistling heron, Syrigma sibilatrix (V)
Tricolored heron, Egretta tricolor (V)
Snowy egret, Egretta thula
Little blue heron, Egretta caerulea

Ibises

Order: PelecaniformesFamily: Threskiornithidae

Threskiornithidae is a family of large terrestrial and wading birds which includes the ibises and spoonbills. They have long, broad wings with 11 primary and about 20 secondary feathers. They are strong fliers and despite their size and weight, very capable soarers. Six species have been recorded in Chile.

White-faced ibis, Plegadis chihi
Puna ibis, Plegadis ridgwayi
Bare-faced ibis, Phimosus infuscatus (V)
Andean ibis, Theristicus branickii
Black-faced ibis, Theristicus melanopis
Roseate spoonbill, Platalea ajaja (V)

New World vultures

Order: CathartiformesFamily: Cathartidae

The New World vultures are not closely related to Old World vultures, but superficially resemble them because of convergent evolution. Like the Old World vultures, they are scavengers. However, unlike Old World vultures, which find carcasses by sight, New World vultures have a good sense of smell with which they locate carrion. Three species have been recorded in Chile.

Andean condor, Vultur gryphus
Black vulture, Coragyps atratus
Turkey vulture, Cathartes aura

Osprey
Order: AccipitriformesFamily: Pandionidae

The family Pandionidae contains only one species, the osprey. The osprey is a medium-large raptor which is a specialist fish-eater with a worldwide distribution.

Osprey, Pandion haliaetus

Hawks

Order: AccipitriformesFamily: Accipitridae

Accipitridae is a family of birds of prey, which includes hawks, eagles, kites, harriers and Old World vultures. These birds have powerful hooked beaks for tearing flesh from their prey, strong legs, powerful talons and keen eyesight. Ten species have been recorded in Chile.

White-tailed kite, Elanus leucurus
Cinereous harrier, Circus cinereus
Long-winged harrier, Circus buffoni (V)
Bicolored hawk, Accipter bicolor
Harris's hawk, Parabuteo unicinctus
Variable hawk, Geranoaetus polyosoma
Black-chested buzzard-eagle, Geranoaetus melanoleucus
White-throated hawk, Buteo albigula
Swainson's hawk, Buteo swainsoni (V)
Rufous-tailed hawk, Buteo ventralis

Barn owls
Order: StrigiformesFamily: Tytonidae

Barn owls are medium to large owls with large heads and characteristic heart-shaped faces. They have long strong legs with powerful talons. One species has been recorded in Chile.

Barn owl, Tyto alba

Owls
Order: StrigiformesFamily: Strigidae

The typical owls are small to large solitary nocturnal birds of prey. They have large forward-facing eyes and ears, a hawk-like beak and a conspicuous circle of feathers around each eye called a facial disk. Six species have been recorded in Chile.

Great horned owl, Bubo virginianus
Rufous-legged owl, Strix rufipes
Peruvian pygmy-owl, Glaucidium peruanum
Austral pygmy-owl, Glaucidium nanum
Burrowing owl, Athene cunicularia
Short-eared owl, Asio flammeus

Kingfishers
Order: CoraciiformesFamily: Alcedinidae

Kingfishers are medium-sized birds with large heads, long pointed bills, short legs, and stubby tails. Two species have been recorded in Chile.

Ringed kingfisher, Megaceryle torquatus
Green kingfisher, Chloroceryle americana (V)

Woodpeckers

Order: PiciformesFamily: Picidae

Woodpeckers are small to medium-sized birds with chisel-like beaks, short legs, stiff tails and long tongues used for capturing insects. Some species have feet with two toes pointing forward and two backward, while several species have only three toes. Many woodpeckers have the habit of tapping noisily on tree trunks with their beaks. Four species have been recorded in Chile.

Striped woodpecker, Dryobates lignarius
Magellanic woodpecker, Campephilus magellanicus
Chilean flicker, Colaptes pitius
Andean flicker, Colaptes rupicola

Falcons

Order: FalconiformesFamily: Falconidae

Falconidae is a family of diurnal birds of prey. They differ from hawks, eagles and kites in that they kill with their beaks instead of their talons. Nine species have been recorded in Chile.

Crested caracara, Caracara plancus
Mountain caracara, Phalcoboenus megalopterus
White-throated caracara, Phalcoboenus albogularis
Striated caracara, Phalcoboenus australis
Chimango caracara, Milvago chimango
American kestrel, Falco sparverius
Orange-breasted falcon, Falco deiroleucus (V)
Aplomado falcon, Falco femoralis
Peregrine falcon, Falco peregrinus

New World and African parrots

Order: PsittaciformesFamily: Psittacidae

Parrots are small to large birds with a characteristic curved beak. Their upper mandibles have slight mobility in the joint with the skull and they have a generally erect stance. All parrots are zygodactyl, having the four toes on each foot placed two at the front and two to the back. Five species have been recorded in Chile.

Mountain parakeet, Psilopsiagon aurifrons
Monk parakeet, Myiopsitta monachus (I)
Austral parakeet, Enicognathus ferrugineus
Slender-billed parakeet, Enicognathus leptorhynchus (E)
Burrowing parakeet, Cyanoliseus patagonus

Tapaculos
Order: PasseriformesFamily: Rhinocryptidae

The tapaculos are small suboscine passeriform birds with numerous species in South and Central America. They are terrestrial species that fly only poorly on their short wings. They have strong legs, well-suited to their habitat of grassland or forest undergrowth. The tail is cocked and pointed. Eight species have been recorded in Chile.

Chestnut-throated huet-huet, Pteroptochos castaneus
Black-throated huet-huet, Pteroptochos tarnii
Moustached turca, Pteroptochos megapodius (E)
White-throated tapaculo, Scelorchilus albicollis (E)
Chucao tapaculo, Scelorchilus rubecula
Ochre-flanked tapaculo, Eugralla paradoxa
Dusky tapaculo, Scytalopus fuscus (E)
Magellanic tapaculo, Scytalopus magellanicus

Ovenbirds
Order: PasseriformesFamily: Furnariidae

Ovenbirds comprise a large family of small sub-oscine passerine bird species found in Central and South America. They are a diverse group of insectivores which gets its name from the elaborate "oven-like" clay nests built by some species, although others build stick nests or nest in tunnels or clefts in rock. Thirty-four species have been recorded in Chile.

Common miner, Geositta cunicularia
Puna miner, Geositta punensis
Rufous-banded miner, Geositta rufipennis
Grayish miner, Geositta maritima
Short-billed miner, Geositta antarctica
Creamy-rumped miner, Geositta isabellina
White-throated treerunner, Pygarrhichas albogularis
Rock earthcreeper, Ochetorhynchus andaecola (V)
Straight-billed earthcreeper, Ochetorhynchus ruficaudus
Band-tailed earthcreeper, Ochetorhynchus phoenicurus
Crag chilia, Ochetorhynchus melanurus (E)
Wren-like rushbird, Phleocryptes melanops
Patagonian forest earthcreeper, Upucerthia saturatior
Scale-throated earthcreeper, Upucerthia dumetaria
White-throated earthcreeper, Upucerthia albigula
Buff-breasted earthcreeper, Upucerthia validirostris
Buff-winged cinclodes, Cinclodes fuscus
Blackish cinclodes, Cinclodes antarcticus
Cream-winged cinclodes, Cinclodes albiventris
Gray-flanked cinclodes, Cinclodes oustaleti
White-winged cinclodes, Cinclodes atacamensis
Dark-bellied cinclodes, Cinclodes patagonicus
Seaside cinclodes, Cinclodes nigrofumosus (E)
Thorn-tailed rayadito, Aphrastura spinicauda
Masafuera rayadito, Aphrastura masafuerae (E)
Des Murs's wiretail, Sylviorthorhynchus desmursii
Plain-mantled tit-spinetail, Leptasthenura aegithaloides
Streaked tit-spinetail, Leptasthenura striata
Creamy-breasted canastero, Asthenes dorbignyi
Austral canastero, Asthenes anthoides
Cordilleran canastero, Asthenes modesta
Sharp-billed canastero, Asthenes pyrrholeuca
Canyon canastero, Asthenes pudibunda
Dusky-tailed canastero, Asthenes humicola (E)

Cotingas
Order: PasseriformesFamily: Cotingidae

The cotingas are birds of forests or forest edges in tropical South America. Comparatively little is known about this diverse group, although all have broad bills with hooked tips, rounded wings and strong legs. The males of many of the species are brightly colored or decorated with plumes or wattles. One species has been recorded in Chile.

Rufous-tailed plantcutter, Phytotoma rara

Tyrant flycatchers

Order: PasseriformesFamily: Tyrannidae

Tyrant flycatchers are passerine birds which occur throughout North and South America. They superficially resemble the Old World flycatchers, but are more robust and have stronger bills. They do not have the sophisticated vocal capabilities of the songbirds. Most, but not all, have plain coloring. As the name implies, most are insectivorous. Forty-nine species have been recorded in Chile.

Cliff flycatcher, Hirundinea ferruginea (H)
White-crested elaenia, Elaenia albiceps
Pied-crested tit-tyrant, Anairetes reguloides
Yellow-billed tit-tyrant, Anairetes flavirostris
Tufted tit-tyrant, Anairetes parulus
Juan Fernandez tit-tyrant, Anairetes fernandezianus (E)
Ticking doradito, Pseudocolopteryx citreola
Short-tailed field tyrant, Muscigralla brevicauda (V)
Great kiskadee, Pitangus sulphuratus (V)
Cattle tyrant, Machetornis rixosa (V)
Boat-billed flycatcher, Megarynchus pitangua (V)
Sulphur-bellied flycatcher, Myiodynastes luteiventris (V)
Streaked flycatcher, Myiodynastes maculatus (V)
Crowned slaty flycatcher, Empidonomus aurantioatrocristatus (V)
Tropical kingbird, Tyrannus melancholicus (V)
Fork-tailed flycatcher, Tyrannus savana (V)
Eastern kingbird, Tyrannus tyrannus (V)
Rufous casiornis, Casiornis rufus (V)
Bran-colored flycatcher, Myiophobus fasciatus
Patagonian tyrant, Colorhamphus parvirostris
d'Orbigny's chat-tyrant, Ochthoeca oenanthoides
White-browed chat-tyrant, Ochthoeca leucophrys
Vermilion flycatcher, Pyrocephalus rubinus
Austral negrito, Lessonia rufa
Andean negrito, Lessonia oreas
Spectacled tyrant, Hymenops perspicillatus
White-winged black-tyrant, Knipolegus aterrimus (H)
Spot-billed ground-tyrant, Muscisaxicola maculirostris
Puna ground-tyrant, Muscisaxicola juninensis
Cinereous ground-tyrant, Muscisaxicola cinereus
White-fronted ground-tyrant, Muscisaxicola albifrons
Ochre-naped ground-tyrant, Muscisaxicola flavinucha
Rufous-naped ground-tyrant, Muscisaxicola rufivertex
Dark-faced ground-tyrant, Muscisaxicola maclovianus
White-browed ground-tyrant, Muscisaxicola albilora
Cinnamon-bellied ground-tyrant, Muscisaxicola capistratus
Black-fronted ground-tyrant, Muscisaxicola frontalis
Rufous-webbed bush-tyrant, Cnemarchus rufipennis
Fire-eyed diucon, Pyrope pyrope
Black-crowned monjita, Neoxolmis coronatus (V)
Chocolate-vented tyrant, Neoxolmis rufiventris
Rusty-backed monjita, Neoxolmis rubetra (V)
Black-billed shrike-tyrant, Agriornis montanus
White-tailed shrike-tyrant, Agriornis albicauda
Great shrike-tyrant, Agriornis lividus
Gray-bellied shrike-tyrant, Agriornis micropterus
Lesser shrike-tyrant, Agriornis murinus (V)
Western wood-pewee, Contopus sordidulus (V)
Many-colored rush tyrant, Tachuris rubrigastra

Vireos
Order: PasseriformesFamily: Vireonidae

The vireos are a group of small to medium-sized passerine birds. They are typically greenish in color and resemble wood warblers apart from their heavier bills. Two species have been recorded in Chile.

Red-eyed vireo, Vireo olivaceus (V)
Chivi vireo, Vireo chivi (V)

Swallows

Order: PasseriformesFamily: Hirundinidae

The family Hirundinidae is adapted to aerial feeding. They have a slender streamlined body, long pointed wings and a short bill with a wide gape. The feet are adapted to perching rather than walking, and the front toes are partially joined at the base. Eleven species have been recorded in Chile.

Blue-and-white swallow, Pygochelidon cyanoleuca
Tawny-headed swallow, Alopochelidon fucata (V)
Andean swallow, Orochelidon andecola
Brown-chested martin, Progne tapera (V)
Gray-breasted martin, Progne chalybea (V)
Southern martin, Progne elegans
Peruvian martin, Progne murphyi
Chilean swallow, Tachycineta leucopyga
Bank swallow, Riparia riparia
Barn swallow, Hirundo rustica
Cliff swallow, Petrochelidon pyrrhonota

Wrens

Order: PasseriformesFamily: Troglodytidae

The wrens are mainly small and inconspicuous except for their loud songs. These birds have short wings and thin down-turned bills. Several species often hold their tails upright. All are insectivorous. Two species have been recorded in Chile.

House wren, Troglodytes aedon
Grass wren, Cistothorus platensis

Thrushes

Order: PasseriformesFamily: Turdidae

The thrushes are a group of passerine birds that occur mainly in the Old World. They are plump, soft plumaged, small to medium-sized insectivores or sometimes omnivores, often feeding on the ground. Many have attractive songs. Five species have been recorded in Chile.

Veery, Catharus fuscescens (V)
Swainson's thrush, Catharus ustulatus (V)
Austral thrush, Turdus falcklandii
Creamy-bellied thrush, Turdus amaurochalinus (V)
Chiguanco thrush, Turdus chiguanco

Mockingbirds

Order: PasseriformesFamily: Mimidae

The mimids are a family of passerine birds that includes thrashers, mockingbirds, tremblers and the New World catbirds. These birds are notable for their vocalizations, especially their ability to mimic a wide variety of birds and other sounds heard outdoors. Their coloring tends towards dull-grays and browns. Five species have been recorded in Chile.

Long-tailed mockingbird, Mimus longicaudatus (H)
Chilean mockingbird, Mimus thenca
Patagonian mockingbird, Mimus patagonicus
Chalk-browed mockingbird, Mimus saturninus (V)
White-banded mockingbird, Mimus triurus

Starlings
Order: PasseriformesFamily: Sturnidae

Starlings are small to medium-sized passerine birds. Their flight is strong and direct and they are very gregarious. Their preferred habitat is fairly open country. They eat insects and fruit. Plumage is typically dark with a metallic sheen. One species has been recorded in Chile.

European starling, Sturnus vulgaris (I) (V)

Old World sparrows

Order: PasseriformesFamily: Passeridae

Sparrows are small passerine birds. In general, sparrows tend to be small, plump, brown or gray birds with short tails and short powerful beaks. Sparrows are seed eaters, but they also consume small insects. One species has been recorded in Chile.

House sparrow, Passer domesticus (I)

Pipits and wagtails
Order: PasseriformesFamily: Motacillidae

Motacillidae is a family of small passerine birds with medium to long tails. They include the wagtails, longclaws, and pipits. They are slender ground-feeding insectivores of open country. Three species have been recorded in Chile.

Peruvian pipit, Anthus peruvianus
Correndera pipit, Anthus correndera
Hellmayr's pipit, Anthus hellmayri

Finches

Order: PasseriformesFamily: Fringillidae

Finches are seed-eating passerine birds, that are small to moderately large and have a strong beak, usually conical and in some species very large. All have twelve tail feathers and nine primaries. These birds have a bouncing flight with alternating bouts of flapping and gliding on closed wings, and most sing well. Five species have been recorded in Chile.

Thick-billed siskin, Spinus crassirostris
Hooded siskin, Spinus magellanica
Black siskin, Spinus atrata
Yellow-rumped siskin, Spinus uropygialis
Black-chinned siskin, Spinus barbata

Sparrows

Order: PasseriformesFamily: Passerellidae

Most of the species are known as sparrows, but these birds are not closely related to the Old World sparrows which are in the family Passeridae. Many of these have distinctive head patterns. One species has been recorded in Chile.

Rufous-collared sparrow, Zonotrichia capensis

Blackbirds

Order: PasseriformesFamily: Icteridae

The icterids are a group of small to medium-sized, often colorful, passerine birds restricted to the New World and include the grackles, New World blackbirds and New World orioles. Most species have black as the predominant plumage color, often enlivened by yellow, orange or red. Eleven species have been recorded in Chile.

Bobolink, Dolichonyx oryzivorus (V)
White-browed meadowlark, Leistes superciliaris (V)
Peruvian meadowlark, Leistes bellicosa
Long-tailed meadowlark, Leistes loyca
Variable oriole, Icterus pyrrhopterus (V)
Baltimore oriole, Icterus galbula (V)
Screaming cowbird, Molothrus rufoaxillaris
Shiny cowbird, Molothrus bonariensis (I)
Austral blackbird, Curaeus curaeus
Grayish baywing, Agelaioides badius (H)
Yellow-winged blackbird, Agelasticus thilius

Wood-warblers
Order: PasseriformesFamily: Parulidae

The wood-warblers are a group of small, often colorful, passerine birds restricted to the New World. Most are arboreal, but some are terrestrial. Most members of this family are insectivores. Nine species have been recorded in Chile.

Northern waterthrush, Parkesia noveboracensis (V)
Tennessee warbler, Oreothlypis peregrina (V)
Masked yellowthroat, Geothlypis aequinoctialis (V)
American redstart, Setophaga ruticilla (V)
Tropical parula, Setophaga pitiayumi (V)
Blackburnian warbler, Setophaga fusca (V)
Blackpoll warbler, Setophaga striata (V)
Black-throated green warbler, Setophaga virens (V)
Canada warbler, Cardellina canadensis (V)

Cardinal grosbeaks
Order: PasseriformesFamily: Cardinalidae

The cardinals are a family of robust, seed-eating birds with strong bills. They are typically associated with open woodland. The sexes usually have distinct plumages. Two species have been recorded in Chile.

Summer tanager, Piranga rubra (V)
Black-backed grosbeak, Pheucticus aureoventris (V)

Tanagers

Order: PasseriformesFamily: Thraupidae

The tanagers are a large group of small to medium-sized passerine birds restricted to the New World, mainly in the tropics. Many species are brightly colored. As a family they are omnivorous, but individual species specialize in eating fruits, seeds, insects, or other types of food. Thirty-five species have been recorded in Chile.

Giant conebill, Conirostrum binghami
Tamarugo conebill, Conirostrum tamarugense
Cinereous conebill, Conirostrum cinereum
Puna yellow-finch, Sicalis lutea
Bright-rumped yellow-finch, Sicalis uropygialis
Greater yellow-finch, Sicalis auriventris
Greenish yellow-finch, Sicalis olivascens
Patagonian yellow-finch, Sicalis lebruni
Saffron finch, Sicalis flaveola
Grassland yellow-finch, Sicalis luteola
Raimondi's yellow-finch, Sicalis raimondii
Black-hooded sierra finch, Phrygilus atriceps
Gray-hooded sierra finch, Phrygilus gayi
Patagonian sierra finch, Phrygilus patagonicus
Mourning sierra finch, Phrygilus fruticeti
Red-backed sierra finch, Phrygilus dorsalis
White-throated sierra finch, Phrygilus erythronotus
Band-tailed sierra finch, Phrygilus alaudinus
Plumbeous sierra finch, Geospizopsis unicolor
Ash-breasted sierra finch, Geospizopsis plebejus
White-bridled finch, Melanodera melanodera
Yellow-bridled finch, Melanodera xanthogramma
Band-tailed seedeater, Catamenia analis
Black-throated flowerpiercer, Diglossa brunneiventris
Blue-black grassquit, Volatinia jacarina
Swallow tanager, Tersina viridis (V)
Lined seedeater, Sporophila lineola (V)
Chestnut-throated seedeater, Sporophila telasco
Double-collared seedeater, Sporophila caerulescens (V)
Golden-billed saltator, Saltator aurantiirostris
Slender-billed finch, Xenospingus concolor
Ringed warbling finch, Microspingus torquatus (V)
Glacier finch, Diuca speculifer
Diuca finch, Diuca diuca
Blue-and-yellow tanager, Rauenia bonariensis

See also
 Wildlife of Chile
List of birds
Lists of birds by region

References

External links

Birds of Chile for the country and by region - World Institute for Conservation and Environment

Chile
 
Birds
Chile